Norman Brown may refer to:

 W. Norman Brown (1892–1975), Indologist and Sanskritist
 Norman O. Brown (1913–2002), American philosopher and sociologist
 Norman E. Brown (1890–1958), sports editor of the Central Press Association
 Norman John Brown, 1985 recipient of the David Richardson Medal
 Norman Brown (cricketer) (1889–1962), Australian cricketer
 Norman Brown (curler) (born 1961), Scottish curler
 Norman Brown (footballer) (1885–1938), English footballer
 Norman Brown (guitarist) (born 1970), American jazz guitarist
 Norm Brown (born 1943), Australian rules footballer
 Norm Brown (baseball) (1919–1995), American baseball player
 Norman Brown (motorcyclist) (1960–1983), Northern Irish motorcycle road racer
 Norman Cole Brown (1901–1996), founder of the Anchorage Daily News
 Norman K. Brown (born 1936), American man who has worked on seven consecutive United States Censuses